Harav Avraham Yosef is the former Chief Rabbi of Holon and Sephardi representative on the Chief Rabbinate Council (Moetzet Harabbanut Harashit). He stepped down from his positions after pleading guilty to breach of trust, after using his office to promote his family's financial interests.

Background

Harav Avraham Yosef is a son of Shas' spiritual leader, and former Israeli Chief Rabbi, Ovadia Yosef, and a brother of Rabbi Yaakov Yosef, a Jerusalem politician who was a member of the Eleventh Knesset. Yosef served for thirteen years in the Military Rabbinate and in 2013 would be the first choice of his father to be nominated for the position of Sepharadi Chief Rabbi but would pull out due to negative publicity concerning a 2010 ruling on judges joining a prayer minyan.

Chief Rabbi of Holon

Dr. Nissim Leon, of Bar-Ilan University, researches the Shas movement and says that Avraham Yosef is a new rising star worthy of note for the political party. Leon states that, "Rabbi Avraham Yosef is building up his reputation using a similar method to his father's, combining halakhic rulings with lectures and classes for large audiences. Among other things, he is a very popular halakhic arbiter on the Haredi radio station Kol Chai."

In 2015, Yosef was indicted for fraud and breach of trust over allegations that he had used his position as Chief Rabbi to advance the business interests of his family's kosher food certification. Yosef was convicted for breach of trust in 2017, for forcing local businesses to use his family's certification. He had reached a plea agreement with the prosecution to resign all his communal offices, and not to take another public position for 7 years after his conviction.

2007 Rabbinate shmita decision

During 2007, Sephardic and Ashkenazi rabbis were at odds over whether to allow the sale of fruit and vegetables during shmita. Later in the year, the Chief Rabbinate set up a special body, headed by Rabbi Ze'ev Weitman, and Rabbi Avraham Yosef to implement heter mechira.

References 

Living people
Egyptian Jews
Ovadia Yosef
Iraqi Jews
Israeli Mizrahi Jews
Sephardic Haredi rabbis in Israel
21st-century Israeli rabbis
Holon
Year of birth missing (living people)
Chief rabbis of cities in Israel